Brian Richard Pratt (born 1953) is a Canadian geologist and paleontologist. He is a professor in the Department of Geological Sciences at the University of Saskatchewan and a fellow of the Geological Society of America.

Early life and education
Pratt was born in Hamilton, Ontario, but grew up in the Niagara Escarpment.

In 1980, his Masters thesis The St. George Group (Lower Ordovician), western Newfoundland: sedimentology, diagenesis and cryptalgal structures was the recipient of the Canadian Society of Petroleum Geologists Best M.Sc. Thesis Award. At the time, he was also employed by Petro Canada.

While conducting his PhD research, Pratt discovered fossilized worm burrows on the western side of the Mackenzie Mountains.

Career
Pratt joined the Department of Geological Sciences at the University of Saskatchewan in 1989. In 2002, he was the recipient of the W. W. Hutchison Medal from the Geological Association of Canada. He was also awarded a research grant to study limestone reef. He also sat as Chair on the North American Commission on Stratigraphic Nomenclature from 2002 until 2003. Two years later, in 2004, Pratt was named an associate editor for the Journal of Paleontology.

In 2006, Pratt was elected to serve on the  University Council and was the recipient of the Past-President's Medal from the Geological Association of Canada. Later in 2008, Pratt was elected to serve on the council for the Geological Society of America.  He was also selected to Chair the International Subcommission on Stratigraphic Classification, replacing Maria Bianca Cita. Pratt was also elected the 2008 Chair of the International Subcommission on Stratigraphic Classification by a vote of 16 to 13. The following year, Pratt was elected a fellow of the Geological Society of America.

In 2012, Pratt was selected to sit on the board of Global Heritage Stone Resource as Vice President of the North America branch. In 2014, he was elected president of the Geological Association of Canada. After serving his term, he sat on the Executive Committee for the 2015–16 year.

References

External links

Living people
People from Hamilton, Ontario
Canadian geologists
Canadian paleontologists
Academic staff of the University of Saskatchewan
Fellows of the Geological Society of America
1953 births